The Women's Javelin Throw event at the 2007 World Championships in Athletics took place on August 29, 2007 (qualification) and August 31, 2007 (final) at the Nagai Stadium in Osaka, Japan. The qualification mark was set at 61.00 metres.

Medalists

Schedule
All times are Japan Standard Time (UTC+9)

Abbreviations

Records

Qualification

Group A

Group B

Final

References
Event report - IAAF.org
Official results, final - IAAF.org
Official results, qualification - IAAF.org
todor66

Javelin throw
Javelin throw at the World Athletics Championships
2007 in women's athletics